Laurent Pardo (16 August 1961 – 5 November 2016) was a French bass guitarist, violoncellist, and background singer. He was best known for playing in the rock band of American singer Elliott Murphy.

Career
After learning the trade and refining his technique with regional bands, Pardo joined the Paris-based US-American singer-songwriter Elliott Murphy in late 2005. As the bass player of Murphy's backing group The Normandy All Stars(the other two members being guitarist Olivier Durand and Alan Fatras on drums) he has toured large parts of Europe and, repeatedly since 2009, the east coast of the United States. He is featured on four of Murphy's studio albums and can be heard and seen on the CD/DVD-set Alive In Paris. Occasionally, Pardo reunited with former Mister Moonlight members and affiliates for concerts and recordings.

LP- and CD-Discography
1985 "Alan Woody" with Alan Woody
1988 Precious Time with Mister Moonlight
1988 Hands (2LP) with Kid Pharaon
1988 Circles On Me (EP/MCD) with Kid Pharaon
1989 Lullaby with Mister Moonlight
1991 Deep Sleep with Kid Pharaon Merry Go Round
1994 Live June 16 with Mister Moonlight
1999 Prenez place dans mon bain with Gul de Boa
1993 Le petit monde with Fata Morgana
2004 The Crossing with The Jury
2007 Coming Home Again with Elliott Murphy
2008 Notes From The Underground with Elliott Murphy
2009 Alive In Paris (CD/DVD-set) with Elliott Murphy
2010 High Lonesomes with Johan Asherton
2010 God save the Sex Pistols (compilation) with Mister Moonlight
2010 Elliott Murphy with Elliott Murphy
2011 Just For One Day - KinkFM 2 Meter Sessie (7 track mini album) with Elliott Murphy
2011 Just A Story From New York with Elliott Murphy (a limited 2CD edition of this live album contains 4 bonus tracks)
2012 The House Of Many Doors with Johan Asherton
2013 It Takes A Worried Man with Elliott Murphy
2013 Forty Five with The Normandy All Stars
2014 Songs from the Kitchen, Vol. 1 (Intime) (EP = 5 track CD) with Elliott Murphy

References

External links
Discographie du rock français

1961 births
2016 deaths
French bass guitarists
Male bass guitarists
French male guitarists